Marianne Moore is an American politician from Maine. Moore, a Republican, was elected to the Maine Senate in 2018 (District 6). She is a resident of Calais, Maine and previously served as mayor. In the Legislature, Moore represents a largely rural district covering Washington County, Maine. In 2019, Moore co-sponsored a bill to end "food-shaming" in public schools. It "prohibits punishing, openly identifying or stigmatizing a student who cannot pay or who has payments due."

Moore earned a BAAS in Computer Software Programming/Computer Science from Dallas Baptist University and an MBA in Managing Information Systems from Southern Methodist University.

References

Year of birth missing (living people)
Living people
People from Calais, Maine
Mayors of places in Maine
Republican Party Maine state senators
Women state legislators in Maine
Women mayors of places in Maine
Dallas Baptist University alumni
Southern Methodist University alumni
21st-century American politicians
21st-century American women politicians